Riverside, Georgia may refer to:

 Riverside, Colquitt County, Georgia, a former town
 Riverside, Atlanta, a neighborhood
 Riverside (Fort Benning, Georgia), a historic house
 Riverside (Toccoa, Georgia), a registered historic place in Stephens County